Opatów may refer to the following places:
Opatów, Greater Poland Voivodeship (west-central Poland)
Opatów, Silesian Voivodeship (south Poland)
Opatów in Świętokrzyskie Voivodeship (south-central Poland)